balenaEtcher (commonly referred to and formerly known as Etcher) is a free and open-source utility used for writing image files such as .iso and .img files, as well as zipped folders onto storage media to create live SD cards and USB flash drives. It is developed by Balena, and licensed under Apache License 2.0. Etcher is a free, open-source tool that allows users to write images to portable storage media such as USB sticks and SD cards balenaEtcher[2]. Etcher was developed using the Electron framework and supports Windows, macOS and Linux. balenaEtcher was originally called Etcher, but its name was changed on October 29, 2018, when Resin.io changed its name to Balena.

Features 
Etcher is primarily used through a graphical user interface. Additionally, there is a command line interface available which is under active development.

Future planned features include support for persistent storage allowing live SD card or USB flash drive to be used as a hard drive, as well as support for flashing multiple boot partitions to a single SD card or USB flash drive.

See also
List of tools to create Live USB systems

References

External links 

Github Repository

Cross-platform software
Free system software
Linux installation software
Multiboot live USB